Deni Alar (born 18 January 1990) is an Austrian professional footballer of Croatian descent who plays as a striker for Austrian Regionalliga East club First Vienna.

Club career
Born in Slavonski Brod, SR Croatia, at the time part of Yugoslavia, he played for Austrian Football Bundesliga side Kapfenberger SV, until his transfer to Rapid Wien. This transfer was announced on 3 June 2011.

On 9 May 2018 he played as Sturm Graz beat Red Bull Salzburg in extra time to win the 2017/18 Austrian Cup. He later returned to Rapid Wien. On 26 June 2019, he was loaned out for one year to Bulgarian club Levski Sofia, with the option of joining the "bluemen" permanently for two more seasons.

On 28 June 2021, he signed a one-year contract with SKN St. Pölten.

Alar moved to Austrian Regionalliga East club First Vienna on 5 February 2022, signing a one-year contract.

International career
Alar got his first call up to the senior Austria side for a 2018 FIFA World Cup qualifier against Republic of Ireland in June 2017. On 14 November 2017, he did his debut for the senior national team in a 2–1 victory in a friendly against Uruguay where he replaced Marko Arnautović in the 86th minute.

Personal life
He is the son of former Croatian footballer Goran Alar.

Honours
Sturm Graz
Austrian Cup: 2017–18

Individual
Austrian Bundesliga Team of the Year: 2016–17, 2017–18

References

External links
 
 Profile at LevskiSofia.info

1990 births
Living people
Austrian footballers
Austria international footballers
Austria under-21 international footballers
Austrian expatriate footballers
Association football forwards
Kapfenberger SV players
SK Rapid Wien players
DSV Leoben players
SK Sturm Graz players
PFC Levski Sofia players
SKN St. Pölten players
First Vienna FC players
Austrian Football Bundesliga players
2. Liga (Austria) players
First Professional Football League (Bulgaria) players
Expatriate footballers in Bulgaria
Sportspeople from Slavonski Brod
People from Zeltweg
Austrian people of Croatian descent

Footballers from Styria